Fionnuala Boyd (born 1944) is a British artist.

Biography 
Fionnuala Boyd was in Welwyn Garden City, Hertfordshire in 1944. She studied at the St Albans School of Art. Much of her work has been in collaboration with her husband, Les Evans. Her work is in the permanent collection of the Tate Gallery and they known as Boyd & Evans.

References

External links
 BOYD & EVANS: Artists' website

1944 births
Living people
20th-century English women artists
21st-century English women artists
People from Welwyn Garden City